Hilaire-Bernard de Requeleyne, baron de Longepierre (18 October 1659 – 30 March 1721) was a 17th–18th-century French playwright.

Short biography 
A child prodigy, quoted in Enfants célèbres by Baillet, Baron Longepierre began by giving translations of Greek poets accompanied by scholarly notes. The coldness and infidelity of these translations earned him the sarcasm of Jean-Baptiste Rousseau, who then mocked his trials at tragedies.

If the bucolic style
Denigrated him,
He wants by the dramatic
Be drawn
From the rank of abject authors.
Greeks live !

Longepierre's tragedies aimed in fact to regain the perfect purity of Greek theater. His best play, Medea (1694), was first greeted coldly but triumphed when it was revived in 1728 and every time a talented actress undertook the title role. This tragedy, devoid of love, has terrifying passages, but it is static and the style is hard, verbose and declamatory. Longepierre then gave Sesostris (1695) and Electra (1702) which had little performances.

Despite Rousseau's epigrams, Longepierre, who had a large fortune, enjoyed general respect and was preceptor to the Count of Toulouse, then to the Duke of Chartres, future regent of the kingdom, of which he became ordinary gentleman. He was also private secretary of the Duke of Berry.

Works 
Dramas
1694: Médée, five-act tragedy, 13 February
1695: Sésostris, five-act tragedy
1702: Électre, five-act tragedy
1712: Jérusalem délivrée, five-act tragédie en musique, music by the Duke of Orléans, played in Fontainebleau on 17 October
Poetry and translations
1684: Odes d'Anacréon et de Sapho, translated into French verse with remarks
1686: Idylles de Bion et de Moschus, translated into French verse with remarks (text available on Gallica)
1687: Discours sur les anciens, against Charles Perrault
1688: Idylles de Théocrite, translated into French verse
1690: Idylles nouvelles
1719: Lettre à M. de Voltaire sur la nouvelle tragédie d'Œdipe (text available on Gallica)

Bibliography 
Gustave Vapereau: "Hilaire-Bernard de Longepierre" in Dictionnaire universel des littératures, Paris, Hachette, 1876, 2 volumes

External links 
 Hilaire-Bernard de Longepierre on data.bnf.fr 
 Hilaire-Bernard de Longepierre on wikisource.
His tragedies and their presentations on CÉSAR

17th-century French dramatists and playwrights
17th-century French male writers
18th-century French dramatists and playwrights
1659 births
Writers from Dijon
1721 deaths